George Philip "Flappie" Lochner  (11 January 1914 – 30 January 1996) was a South African rugby union player.

Biography
Lochner was born in Vanrhynsdorp. He attended the Hoërskool Dirkie Uys in Moorreesburg, after which he studied at Stellenbosch University. After completing his studies, Lochner began teaching, first in Cradock and later at Kingswood College in Grahamstown. In 1935 he made his provincial debut for the.

Lochner also played 9 tour matches and scored eight tries. In 1938 he played in two test matches against the touring team from the British Isles, scoring one try.

Lochner returned to Stellenbosch in 1939 to further his studies where he played for. In 1940 he became a lecturer at the Wellington Training College and played for Wellington Club and for from 1940 to 1943. He later served as selector and manager of the Springbok team.

Test history

See also
List of South Africa national rugby union players – Springbok no. 249

References

1914 births
1996 deaths
South African rugby union players
South Africa international rugby union players
Eastern Province Elephants players
Western Province (rugby union) players
Boland Cavaliers players
People from Matzikama Local Municipality
Rugby union players from the Western Cape
Rugby union centres